Ross Snook (born 21 May 1971) is a Canadian professional darts player who is currently playing in World Darts Federation events.

Career
He won the Bob Jones Memorial in 2012 and 2013, and then made his big breakthrough in 2016, when he won the PDC North American Qualifying tournament by defeating Darin Young 3–0 in the final, but he then lost 2–0 to Finland's Kim Viljanen in the preliminary round.

World Championship results

PDC
 2017: Preliminary round (lost to Kim Viljanen 0–2)

References

External links
Profile and Stats on Darts Database

1971 births
Living people
Professional Darts Corporation associate players
Canadian darts players
People from Newfoundland (island)
Sportspeople from Newfoundland and Labrador